This is a list of electoral results for the Electoral district of Harvey in Western Australian state elections.

Members for Harvey

Election results

Elections in the 1950s

References

Western Australian state electoral results by district